9J or 9-J can refer to:

9-j symbol
IATA code for Dana Air
New York State Route 9J
Le Rhône 9J 
AIM-9J, a model of AIM-9 Sidewinder
F-9J, a model of Grumman F-9 Cougar
GCR Class 9J, a class of British 0-6-0 steam locomotive
 France's Rotary Engine Le Rhone 9J

See also
J9 (disambiguation)